St. Patrick Church is a Roman Catholic church in Bridgeport, Connecticut, part of the  Diocese of Bridgeport.

History 
St. Patrick Church is first Catholic church in the North End of Bridgeport. The immense church makes quite an impression on unsuspecting motorists traveling on the Interstate highway close by.
The parish was formed from the third division of the parish of St. Augustine's Cathedral.

Building
After the parish's founding, masses were held for many years in a basement church designed by James Murphy or Providence, RI. Around 1910, the massive superstructure was added by Dwyer and McMahon of Hartford, CT.

References

External links 
 St. Patrick - Diocesan information 
 St. Patrick Website (The Cathedral Parish)
 Diocese of Bridgeport

James Murphy (architect) buildings
Saint Patrick's Church
Roman Catholic churches completed in 1910
Roman Catholic Diocese of Bridgeport
20th-century Roman Catholic church buildings in the United States